Héctor Martín Desvaux (born 4 February 1980 in Santa Fe) is an Argentine football defender currently playing for Central Córdoba.

Career 
Desvaux started his career with Unión de Santa Fe in 2001 while the team played in the Primera División Argentina. In 2003, his club was relegated from the Argentine Primera but Desvaux stayed with them.

During the 2005–06 season, Desvaux played for Ben Hur, but returned to Unión the following season. In 2007, he returned to the top flight of Argentine football, signing for Gimnasia de Jujuy on loan. At the end of the 2007–08 season Gimnasia defeated Unión, Desvaux's former team, in the playoff to avoid relegation and the defender played both home and away games (along goalkeeper Nereo Fernández, another former Unión player loaned to Gimnasia).

In 2010, Desvaux joined Chilean side Santiago Wanderers.

External links
 Argentine Primera stats at Futbol XXI  
 Football-Lineups player profile 

1980 births
Living people
Footballers from Santa Fe, Argentina
Argentine footballers
Association football defenders
Unión de Santa Fe footballers
Gimnasia y Esgrima de Jujuy footballers
Argentine people of French descent
Atlético Tucumán footballers
Santiago Wanderers footballers
Expatriate footballers in Chile